The London Evening News was a newspaper whose first issue was published on 14 August 1855.

Usually, when people mention the London Evening News, they are actually referring to The Evening News, published in London from 1881 to 1980, when it was incorporated into the Evening Standard. The last issue was published on Friday 31 October 1980.

Sources

Defunct newspapers published in the United Kingdom
London newspapers
Publications established in 1855
1855 establishments in England